George Harrison Shull (April 15, 1874 – September 28, 1954) was an American plant geneticist and the younger brother of botanical illustrator and plant breeder J. Marion Shull. He was born on a farm in Clark County, Ohio, graduated from Antioch College in 1901 and from the University of Chicago (Ph.D.) in 1904, served as botanical expert to the Bureau of Plant Industry in 1903-04, and thenceforth was a botanical investigator of the Carnegie Institution at the Station for Experimental Evolution, Cold Spring Harbor, N. Y., giving special attention to the results of Luther Burbank's work.

Shull played an important role in the development of hybrid maize (in the USA, popularly 'corn') which had great impact upon global agriculture. As a geneticist, Shull worked with maize plants.  He was interested in pure breeds not for their economic value but for his experiments in genetics. He produced maize breeds that bred true and then crossed these strains. The hybrid offspring of the sickly pure breeds were vigorous and predictable.

In short, an ideal economic maize resulted from a project motivated purely to advance science. For his work on maize, Shull was awarded the Public Welfare Medal from the National Academy of Sciences in 1948.

He also described heterosis in  maize in 1908 (the term heterosis was coined by Shull in 1914) and made a number of other key discoveries in the emerging field of genetics. Shull was the founder of the scientific journal Genetics.

He was called George in distinction from his son Harrison Shull (1923–2003), also a distinguished scientist, specializing in the quantum mechanics of small-molecule electronic spectra.

Work with Luther Burbank
Shull worked with Luther Burbank from 1906 to 1914 in an attempt to publish Burbank's plant work on the behalf of the Carnegie Institution.  Ultimately unable to get Burbank's full cooperation, and finding that in the Luther Burbank Press's 1914 publication Luther Burbank:  His Methods and Discoveries, Their Practical Application "considerable sections are almost word for word the same as my ... manuscript," Shull never published his work.

Personal life
Shull married Ella Amanda Hollar in July 1906.  A daughter, Elizabeth Ellen, born May 8, 1907, did not survive her birth.  Ella died two weeks later. All are buried in Santa Rosa, California, in the Odd Fellows Lawn Cemetery. Shull married Mary Julia Nicholl on August 26, 1909. He and his second wife had six children (John Shull, Georgia Shull Vandersloot, Frederick Shull, David Shull, Barbara Shull Miller, and Harrison Shull.)

Death
Shull died in Princeton on September 28, 1954.  His cremains were buried in Santa Rosa, California  where his first wife was buried.  His second wife's remains were also buried there twelve years later.

References

Smocovitis, V.B. Shull, George Harrison. American National Biography Online. 2000
Nina Fedoroff and Nancy Marie Brown. Mendel in the Kitchen. Joseph Henry Press, Washington, D.C. 2004, pages 57–62.
A reference to George H. Shull's discovery of the process of heterosis is in the movie "High Time" starring Bing Crosby about a wealthy man going back to college to get his bachelor's degree.  When quizzing with a younger fraternity brother, Crosby's character asks "Who discovered the process of heterosis?"  to which the young student answers "George W. (pause), NO, George H. Shull"

External links
Biographical Memoir of Harrison Shull, George's son
 

1874 births
1954 deaths
American geneticists
American botanists
University of Chicago alumni
People from Clark County, Ohio
Genetics (journal) editors